The Act No. 1 of 2023 on Criminal Code, or the 2023 Indonesian Criminal Code, is the new Indonesian criminal code replacing the Dutch-era code. The law is the most expensive and longest ever made in Indonesia, being more than 50 years in the making since formulation until finally commenced by the Indonesian government.

The code, however, will be effectively used on 2 January 2026, 3 years after commencement.

History 
Before the law passed, the Dutch-made Criminal Code was used as the Criminal Code for Indonesia. Since 1968, Indonesian lawmakers, law experts, and law researchers had been working on Indonesian-made Criminal Code drafts. Various drafts were made, but never replaced the Code.

The Indonesian government has considered changes to the Criminal Code ever since independence, with the colonial-era code being seen as a mismatch with current cultural values. In 2019, a new bill on criminal code was publicly announced, but controversial provisions criminalizing extramarital sex, abortions, and other restrictions on religious and civil liberties led to a series of protests and riots in response, ultimately causing the bill to replace the code to be scrapped. However, in 2022, a bill reintroducing the 2019 proposal with some statutes being "watered down" was passed by Indonesia's parliament and is planned to take effect in full after a three-year provisional period, despite similar concerns about its effect on civil rights and the rights of religious and sexual minorities. 

The new criminal code is finally enacted as Law No. 1/2023 on the Criminal Code. The code is expanded to 624 articles, split into 2 Books: "General Provisions" and "Crime"; The new code no longer differentiates crime from lesser misdemeanors. It also contains provisions regarding government acknowledgement regarding 'living laws' (adat or customary rules) in punishing crimes.

Repealed Laws 

 Staatsblad No. 732 of 1915 as amended by Law No. 1/1946 on Criminal Code.
 Law No. 73/1958 on Establishment of Law No.1/1946 as Criminal Code for all Indonesian regions.
 Law No. 1/1960 on Amendment of Criminal Code.
 Law No. 16/Prp/1960 on Some Amendments of Criminal Code.
 Law No. 18/Prp/1960 on Changes in Fine in Criminal Code and other Criminal Regulations.
 Law No. 7/1974 on Gambling Control.
 Law No. 4/1976 on Amendment Related Expansion of Criminal Acts Defined in Criminal Code, and Crimes against Aviation and Aviation Infrastructures.
 Law No. 27/1999 on Amendment of Criminal Code related to Crimes Against State Security.

Amended Laws 

 Emergency Law No. 1/1951 on Temporary Acts for Organizing Unity and Uniformization of Civil Courts Powers and Procedures.
 Emergency Law No. 12/1951 on Arms.
 Law No. 1/PNPS/1965 on Prevention Against Misuse and/or Desecration of Religions.
 Law No. 31/1999 as amended with Law No. 20/2001 on Eradication of Corruption Crimes.
 Law No. 26/2000 on Human Rights Court.
 Law No. 23/2002 as amended with Law No. 17/2016 on Child Protection.
 Law No. 15/2003 as amended with Law No. 5/2018 on Anti-Terrorism Acts.
 Law No. 20/2003 on National Education System.
 Law No. 21/2007 on Eradication of Human Trafficking Crimes.
 Law No. 11/2008 as amended with Law No. 9/2016 on Electronic Information and Transaction.
 Law No. 40/2008 on Eradication of Racial and Ethnical Discrimination.
 Law No. 44/2008 on Pornography.
 Law No. 24/2009 on Flags, Languages, State Symbols, and National Anthem.
 Law No. 35/2009 on Health.
 Law No. 36/2009 on Narcotics.
 Law No. 8/2010 on Prevention and Eradication of Money Laundering.
 Law No. 6/2011 on Immigration.
 Law No. 7/2011 on Currency.
 Law No. 18/2012 on Foods.
 Law No. 9/2013 on Prevention and Eradication of Terrorism Funding Crimes.
 Law No. 13/2006 as amended with Law No. 31/2014 on Witness and Victim Protection.

Criticisms 
The articles contained several controversial articles:

Crimes against the personal dignity and honor of the sitting president and vice president 
Article 218 verse 1 of the code stated that any person who attack the personal dignity and honor of the sitting president and vice president will be punished by 3 years 6 months imprisonment and category IV (200 million rupiah) fine. Despite that, verse 2 Article 218 guaranteed that such personal attacks may permissible if used for defending oneself or committed for good public interest. Although claimed by the pro-democracy as attack of human rights, the law itself limited that such process of the case report only can be processed if the sitting president or vice president filed themselves in personal capability.

Magic and black magic 
Article 252 of the code regulated magic and black magic. The verse 1 of the article said that anyone who expressed such ability to perform magic, announcing it, giving hope people for it, offering and aiding for such service to cause such immense bodily and mentally harm, diseases, and death will be punished by 1 year 6 months imprisonment and a category IV (200 million rupiahs) fine. Verse 2 of the article gives additional penalties given by the verse 1 to magic and black magic practitioners who make a living on it. This article is controversial, as it is hard to be proven.

Hoaxing and trolling 
Hoaxing and trolling are already part of culture in Indonesia, either by pro-government or anti-government alike, and enjoyed by the Indonesian population. Troll "factories" and so-called "cyber armies" had made a living in Indonesia since 2016, making revenue from sowing discord and flooding Internet space with socio-politico-religious misleadings. Article 263 threatened the trolls and hoax makers with 6 years imprisonment. Protesters protested that such regulation threatened what they called as "democracy" and called that "a move to shut the critics". The Ministry of Law and Human Rights condemned the protesters of the article, assured that their criticism is needed for the country, but feeding lies and misleading people are not. The ministry asked people to read the law carefully and stop consuming irresponsible statements.

Personal space invasion by law enforcement 
Article 411 to 413 of the code outlawed domestic partner relationship, cohabitation, and incestuous relationship. For pro-privacy advocates, such regulation may translated as personal space invasion by law enforcement, although the law itself stated that such acts only able to be processed if the report filed by the members of the family. With the code, government expected that local law enforcement will not invade privacy due to being codified and there will be no more local regulation granting sweeping power to their local law enforcement. These articles however, inapplicable in Aceh Province, which possessed different law enforcement system granted by the Law No. 11/2006 (On Aceh Province), Wilayatul Hisbah, which is not affected by the code. Law enforcement in Aceh even enjoyed protection under the Article 597 of the code, given its status as customary laws protected by the code.

Responses

Attacks against government institutions 

On 7 December 2022, a suicide bombing incident occurred at a police station in Astana Anyar District, Bandung, West Java. The attacker and one police officer were killed by the explosion, while 11 people were injured, including 3 police officers. Police Chief General Listyo Sigit Prabowo said that the perpetrator was affiliated to the Jamaah Ansharut Daulah (JAD) Bandung branch. 

Opposition to the passing of the Criminal Code Bill into law was the motive of the bombing, as the motorcycle used by the suicide bomber to reach the police station was adorned by pamphlets condeming the Criminal Code. One of the pamphlets brought by the perpetrator read "KUHP is the law of the mushrik and infidels, declare war to the enforcers of the Devil's Law." The same pamphlet also made reference to verse 29 of Surah At-Tawba, which called for the imposition of jizya to non-Muslims.

Foreign condemnation 
The passing of the law was condemned by the governments of Australia, United States, South Korea and even the United Nations, largely for not accommodating LGBT and domestic partnership relation protection and rights, as well as not ensuring enough privacy, equity, religious freedom, journalism and sexuality issues. The European Union also condemned the law due to too much regulations on privacy with emphasis on premarital sex, threatening democracy and freedom of speech, and promotion of Western ideologies in Indonesia. The Executive Office of the President of the Republic of Indonesia rejected the claim that the new law contradicts democracy. The deputy minister of the Ministry of Law and Human Rights rejected the international condemnations because the law is considered domestic and should not be compared with Western and international values.

See also 

 Law of Indonesia

References 

Law of Indonesia
Omnibus legislation